The Circus Man is a 1914 silent film produced by Jesse Lasky and distributed by Paramount Pictures. It was directed by Oscar Apfel and written by Cecil B. DeMille from a story based on the novel The Rose in the Ring by George Barr McCutcheon. It is preserved at the Library of Congress.

Cast
Theodore Roberts - Thomas Braddock
Mabel Van Buren - Mary Braddock
Florence Dagmar - Christine Braddock
Hubert Whitehead - Frank Jenison
Jode Mullally - David Jenison
Raymond Hatton - Ernie Cronk
Frank Hickman - Dick Cronk
Fred Montague - Colonel Grand
William Elmer - Isaac Perry (*as Billy Elmer)
James Neill - Richard Jenison

References

External links

1914 films
Silent American drama films
American silent feature films
Films based on American novels
Films directed by Oscar Apfel
Paramount Pictures films
1914 drama films
American black-and-white films
Circus films
1910s American films